Matthew Warren Heimbach (born April 8, 1991) is an American white supremacist who advocated a neo-Nazi ideology. Heimbach now identifies as a National Bolshevik. Instead of supporting racist policies, Heimbach now claims that he advocates "proletarian internationalism and cross-racial solidarity against capitalism and its elites." He tried to form alliances between several far-right extremist groups. In 2018, Heimbach briefly served as community outreach director for the National Socialist Movement (NSM). He founded the Traditionalist Worker Party (TWP), which ceased operation in March 2018 until early 2020 when Heimbach and Matthew Parrott once again began collaborating on projects such as the "prisoner aid organization", which was known as the Global Minority Initiative while they were also publicly discussing a relaunching of the Traditionalist Worker Party.

Prior to his arrest, Heimbach had assembled a community of neo-Nazis and anti-Jewish conspiracy theorists in a Paoli, Indiana trailer park. Heimbach was considered the leader of this community, and he had received media attention for his role in this regard, but he lost credibility following his arrest in 2018.

Heimbach is a defendant in the Sines v. Kessler lawsuit which was filed by Integrity First for America, the lawsuit claims that he and other organizers of the 2017 Unite the Right white supremacist rally in Charlottesville, Virginia, "planned and promoted violence against [a] protected group."

In 2016, in response to his racist beliefs and his violent actions, Heimbach was excommunicated from the Eastern Orthodox Church.

As of 2020, Heimbach said he was "pulling back" from white nationalism, later describing himself as a "pro-white" National Bolshevik. In 2021, in support of his claim that he was focusing on issues of economic class rather than issues of race, Heimbach told reporters that he was "no longer dwelling on black and white but the 'green' that separates us."

Early life, education, and family 
Heimbach was born in Poolesville, Maryland. Heimbach's parents, Karl and Margaret Heimbach, are public school teachers whose political affiliation he describes as Mitt Romney-style Republicans. Heimbach says his views on race and immigration were formed early on by the writings of Pat Buchanan, especially his book The Death of the West, and particularly Buchanan's paleoconservative writing in American Renaissance. As early as his entrance to college, Towson University, he had begun to take in the writings of Jared Taylor, a self-described "race realist".

In 2013 Heimbach received a Bachelor of Science in History from Towson University.

Heimbach met his former wife Brooke at an American Renaissance conference.

Ideology 
The Southern Poverty Law Center has commented that Heimbach is "considered by many to be the face of a new generation of white nationalists." According to the Counter Extremism Project, "Heimbach's platform is based around the idea that the white race has been disadvantaged because of globalism and multiculturalism, which he has largely blamed on a global Jewish conspiracy. Heimbach claims that white unity is necessary because the Jews hate all white people equally." To promote his anti-Semitism, Heimbach publicly supported terrorist organizations such as Hamas and Islamic Jihad writing that there should be "a unity between those who struggle against the Zionist State and International Jewry here in the West and those on the streets of Gaza, Syria, and Lebanon. We face the exact same enemy, one who doesn't care if they kill our women, children, and elderly. We are facing a truly Satanic enemy."

Heimbach has forged ties with nationalist groups from other countries, like Greece's far-right nationalist party Golden Dawn. As the leader of the Traditionalist Worker Party, Heimbach visited European far-right organizations in Germany, Slovakia, the Czech Republic, Romania, and Russia. The Russian Imperial Movement, an organization that was declared a Foreign Terrorist Organization by the United States Department of State in 2020, had extensive ties with Heimbach. Meetings between the Russian Imperial Movement and the Traditionalist Worker Party were called "the first time that we had a meeting on the U.S. soil of the American white nationalists and then the members of the Russian far right nationalist community." The United Kingdom government banned Heimbach from entering the country in October 2015 because his extremist rhetoric could incite violence.

Heimbach called for the dissolution of the United States of America under the pretense of supporting self-determination for different ethnic and religious communities, going so far as to declare "Death to America." He stated that Americans should "stop fighting a culture war. Just declare both sides victors, and in your respective region, do what you think is best."

In 2014, Heimbach was photographed at a SlutWalk protest brandishing an Orthodox cross as a weapon against anti-racist protestors. In 2016 Heimbach was formally received into the Antiochian Orthodox Christian Archdiocese of North America. Following online circulation of the photos, Heimbach was excommunicated from the Church several weeks later. Following his excommunication, Heimbach received communion from a sympathetic noncanonical Romanian church.

Avowed anti-capitalism and anti-imperialism differentiated Heimbach and the Traditionalist Worker Party from many other American far-right groups. Heimbach stated that "For us, to be truly anti-capitalist is to be a nationalist. Nationalism is a bulwark against capitalist exploitation and globalism." Heimbach identified at the time as a Strasserist.

In April 2020, Heimbach published an open letter saying he was "pulling back" from the white nationalist movement. As of July 2021, he planned to relaunch the Traditionalist Worker Party as a National Bolshevik party.

Far-right involvement 
The Traditionalist Youth Network (TYN) was established in May 2013 by Matthew Heimbach with Matt Parrott as an offshoot of a "White Student Union" which was active on the Towson University campus.

In January 2015, the TYN established the Traditionalist Worker Party (TWP) as its political party prior to the 2016 elections, and a small group of candidates from the far-right ran under its banner. The party stated that it stood against "economic exploitation, federal tyranny, and anti-Christian degeneracy". The Traditionalist Worker Party promoted itself as being a working-class and "left-leaning" neo-Nazi organization more akin to the original Sturmabteilung than more common far-right ideological beliefs of most post-war white supremacists. The Southern Poverty Law Center, which tracks extremist groups, designated the Traditionalist Worker Party as a hate group. The group went dormant in March 2018 following Heimbach's arrest but has begun a relaunch as of July 2021.

Following the model of other white supremacists such as George Lincoln Rockwell and Richard Spencer, Heimbach organized speaking engagements at American universities, causing mass protests by both students and community members. Heimbach is alleged to have met with Republican Party strategists and operatives in January 2017 during the inauguration of Donald Trump.

On January 8, 2021, Chicago's NPR radio station WBEZ reported that Heimbach had participated in an attempted coup at the United States Capitol on January 6, 2021. The caption to WBEZ's photo of insurrectionists confronting U.S. Capitol Police outside the Senate chamber identified "Neo-Nazi Matthew Heimbach (second from left wearing a blue mask)." However, WBEZ later amended its story with an editor's note including Heimbach's denial and his assertion that he was in Tennessee with his family on January 6. In its update, WBEZ removed Heimbach's name from their photo caption. Also on January 8, Fox News identified Heimbach as having been "captured posing for photographs" during the January 6 siege of the U.S. Capitol. Fox News subsequently deleted that story and ran another by the same reporter, stating that "social media posts" had suggested Heimbach "took part in Wednesday's storming of the U.S. Capitol," but not mentioning Fox's own, withdrawn article to that effect. On January 8, Mashable reported that "there is no proof that Heimbach was at the Capitol" on January 6. Brian McCreary, a resident of Massachusetts, was arrested in February 2021 for his participation in the January 6th protest and was identified by police as the individual who had previously been mistaken for Heimbach.

Lawsuits and criminal convictions 
In July 2017, Heimbach pled guilty to second-degree disorderly conduct for an incident when he repeatedly pushed an anti-Trump protester at a Donald Trump campaign rally in Louisville, Kentucky. He received a suspended prison sentence, a fine, and an order to attend anger management classes. In 2018, Heimbach was sentenced to 38 days in the Louisville jail for violating the terms of his probation.

Sines v. Kessler lawsuit 

In October 2017, Heimbach was listed as a defendant in Sines v. Kessler, the federal civil lawsuit against various organizers, promoters, and participants of the 2017 Unite the Right rally. The trial began on October 25, 2021, and the jury reached a verdict on November 23. Heimbach and all other defendants were found liable for civil conspiracy under Virginia state law, and ordered to pay $500,000 in punitive damages. The jury were deadlocked on the two other claims pertaining to Heimbach, which argued he and other defendants had engaged in a federal conspiracy to commit racially-motivated violence.

References 

1991 births
Living people
Activists from Indiana
American people of German descent
American political party founders
American anti-capitalists
American conspiracy theorists
American neo-Nazis
Christian fascists
Criminals from Indiana
National Bolsheviks
People convicted of domestic violence
People excommunicated by the Greek Orthodox Church
Strasserism
Towson University alumni
Former alt-rightists